Look-Ka Py Py is the second studio album by the American funk group The Meters. The instrumental album was ranked number 218 on the Rolling Stone list of 500 Greatest Albums of All Time in 2003, 220 on the 2012 revised list and 415 on the 2020 revised list.

Reception
Cub Koda of AllMusic said of the album and the band: "The second album by The Meters continues the sound that made them New Orleans legends." Ted Drozdowski of Rolling Stone characterized the album's sound as "clear, unhurried and certain". He characterized the guitar sound as "brief, precise", the organ sound as "free of the rhythm", the bass sound as "fat, saw-tooth grooves", and the drum sound as "dry and up front". In ranking the album for its greatest-all-time list, the magazine noted the bass riffs and the off-beat drumming.

The album's title track "Look-Ka Py Py" reached #11 on the US R&B Singles chart and the album reached #23 on the US R&B Albums chart.

Style
In his 2008 book, Tom Moon wrote: "the key characteristic is restraint. Nobody works too hard on Meters records. The rhythm is built on a loose-tight axis, with some elements (usually Zigaboo Modeliste's snappish drumming) pushing forward and other forces (the carefully articulated guitar lines of Leo Nocentelli or spare jabs from Art Neville's B3 organ) pulling back."

Track listing

Personnel
Credits adapted from AllMusic.
The Meters
Ziggy Modeliste – drums
Art Neville – organ
Leo Nocentelli – electric guitar
George Porter Jr. – bass guitar

Production
Allen Toussaint – producer 
Marshall Sehorn – audio production 
Tim Livingston – project manager 
Rodney Mills – audio engineer 
Al Quaglieri – mastering 
Bob Irwin – mastering 
Rich Russell – package design 
Bill Dahl – liner notes

References

1969 albums
The Meters albums
Albums produced by Allen Toussaint
Josie Records albums